Emily Shuk Chi Ching is a Hong Kong theoretical physicist based at the Chinese University of Hong Kong. She researches fluid turbulence and has been elected as a fellow of the Institute of Physics and American Physical Society.

Education
Emily Shuk Chi Ching attended the University of Hong Kong for her bachelor's degree and the Chinese University of Hong Kong for her master's degree. She graduated from the University of Chicago with a PhD in physics in 1992. She then completed a post-doctoral research appointment at the Kavli Institute for Theoretical Physics, which is part of the University of California, Santa Barbara.

Career
After finishing her post-doc, Ching returned to Hong Kong, accepting a position at the Chinese University of Hong Kong in 1995. Her research interests include scaling and structures as they relate to fluid turbulence, polymers in turbulence, boundary layers in Rayleigh–Bénard convection, and network reconstruction from dynamics.

She has been involved as an associate editor or editorial board member for several journals, including Physical Review E, Annual Review of Condensed Matter Physics, and Journal of Turbulence.

Awards and honours
In 1999 she received the Achievement in Asia Award from the Overseas Chinese Physics Association. Ching was elected as a fellow of the Institute of Physics in 2004 and the American Physical Society in 2005.

Personal life
She speaks Cantonese and English.

References

Living people
Chinese University of Hong Kong people
Alumni of the University of Hong Kong
University of Chicago alumni
Hong Kong physicists
Chinese women physicists
Theoretical physicists
Fellows of the American Physical Society
Fellows of the Institute of Physics
Year of birth missing (living people)
Alumni of the Chinese University of Hong Kong